Trotton with Chithurst is a civil parish in the Chichester district of West Sussex, England. The parish also contains the hamlet of Dumpford.

In the 2001 census the parish covered  and had 129 households with a total population of 328.  160 residents were economically active. At the 2011 Census the population had only increased marginally to 329.

Trotton

The village of Trotton is an Anglican parish on the A272, which passes over the River Rother near the church. Traffic over the sandstone bridge, which is Grade I listed and dates to about 1600, is controlled by traffic lights because it is too narrow for two vehicles to pass.

Parish church

St George's Church dates to around 1230, and was rebuilt in about 1400. The church is used by the British Orthodox Church once a month.

History
Trotton (Traitone or Trattone) was listed in the Domesday Book (1086) in the ancient hundred of Dumpford as having 14 households comprising four villagers and ten smallholders; with ploughing land, woodland, meadows, a mill and a church, it had a value to the lord of the manor of £5.

Notable people
According to Samuel Johnson, the author Thomas Otway was born in Trotton (Johnson calls it "Trottin") in 1652. Otway's father, Humphrey, was curate of the parish.

Chithurst
The village of Chithurst contains St. Mary's Church and Cittaviveka, the Chithurst Buddhist Monastery, which is a Buddhist monastery located in Chithurst, which was founded by Ajahn Chah and Ajahn Sumedho.

The church dates to the 11th century It is one of the smallest recorded in Taylor & Taylor's Anglo-Saxon Architecture and exhibits Saxon features in the proportions, the thinness of the walls, a splayed window in the south chancel wall, long-and-short work quoins with large shaped stones, and some herringbone work in the stone rubble masonry of the walls. It consists of nave and chancel which show these signs of construction in the Anglo-Saxon era, later west porch and bell turret.

Chithurst (Titcherste) was listed in the Domesday Book (1086) in the ancient hundred of Dumpford as having 14 households comprising six villagers, five smallholders and three slaves; with ploughing land, woodland, meadows, a mill and a church, it had a value to the lord of the manor of £3.

Dumpford
Dumpford is a hamlet located on a minor road between Trotton and Elsted railway station, and also the name of an historic Hundred, which encompassed 277 households in the settlements of South Harting, East Harting and West Harting, Elsted, Treyford, Chithurst and Trotton.

Dumpford has an hotel, Southdowns Country Hotel, a sewage works and Terwick watermill.

References

External links

St George's Church, Trotton
St Mary's Church, Chithurst
Cittaviveka Buddhist Monastery

Chichester District
Civil parishes in West Sussex